The term gaze is frequently used in physiology to describe coordinated motion of the eyes and neck. The lateral gaze is controlled by the paramedian pontine reticular formation (PPRF). The vertical gaze is controlled by the rostral interstitial nucleus of medial longitudinal fasciculus and the interstitial nucleus of Cajal.

Conjugate gaze
The conjugate gaze is the motion of both eyes in the same direction at the same time, and conjugate gaze palsy refers to an impairment of this function. The conjugate gaze is controlled by four different mechanisms:

 the saccadic system that allows for voluntary direction of the gaze
 the pursuit system that allows the subject to follow a moving object
 nystagmus which includes both vestibular nystagmus and optokinetic nystagmus. The vestibular system restores gaze in compensation for the rotation of the head whereas the optokinetic system restores gaze despite movements of the outside world.
 the vestibulo-ocular reflex system (VOR system) that corrects for the movements of the head to preserve the stable visual image of the world

References

External links
 http://www.med.yale.edu/caim/cnerves/cn6/cn6_8.html
 

Eye
Neurophysiology